Vittoria Cesarini (born 13 February 1932) is an Italian sprinter. She competed in the women's 100 metres at the 1952 Summer Olympics.

References

External links
 

1932 births
Living people
Athletes (track and field) at the 1952 Summer Olympics
Italian female sprinters
Olympic athletes of Italy
Sportspeople from Bologna
Olympic female sprinters